The 1978 Soviet Chess Championship was the 46th edition of USSR Chess Championship. Held from 1-27 December 1978 in Tbilisi. Mikhail Tal and Vitaly Tseshkovsky shared the title. The qualifying tournaments took place in Daugavpils and Ashkhabad. This edition marked the debut of the future world champion Garry Kasparov in the Soviet championships.

Qualifying

Swiss Qualifying 
The Swiss Qualifying was held in Daugavpils from 27 June to 16 July 1978 with 64 players. Garry Kasparov won gaining a direct promotion to the
final.

First League 
The top seven qualified for the final.

Final 

The fmal at Tbilisi featured the qualifiers plus Tamaz Georgadze as the local Georgian representative and the players who entered directly for the historical performance in previous championships.

References 

USSR Chess Championships
Chess
1978 in chess
Chess